Powerhouse Gym is made up of more than 200 fitness center owners who are licensed to use the name Powerhouse Gym.

History

Powerhouse Gym was founded in 1975 by brothers William and Norman Dabish in Highland Park, Michigan. The gym started out as a facility for people in the neighborhood to exercise and soon became a place for professional athletes to train. Some of the athletes who trained were professional boxer Tommy "Hitman" Hearns, professional bodybuilders Samir Bannout and Tom Platz, among many others. In 1984  Powerhouse Gym began a licensing division which enabled them to grow from a small inner city gym to the much larger organization it is today. Over the years Powerhouse Gym has accumulated  over 300 licensees and is located in 39 states and 15 countries.

Additional information
In addition to the expansion of Powerhouse Gym they have been able to create other marketing tools that also have grown with the company. In 1984 Powerhouse created their own clothing line. Starting with only four small items, over the years their clothing and accessory line is now one of the largest in the fitness industry. Powerhouse also became involved with in the media side of things when they created their own publication Powerhouse magazine in 1992. This magazine was created to help their licensee's on their new business venture,  and to inform members and potential members what is going on in their company. In 2002 Powerhouse Gym created Powerhouse T.V. which is a personalized network where the gym owners can control advertisements and music played.

References

External links
Official Website

Gyms in the United States